Acrobasis olivalis is a species of snout moth in the genus Acrobasis. It was described by George Hampson in 1896, and is known from Australia.

References

Moths described in 1896
Acrobasis
Moths of Australia